Acrolophus plumifrontella, the eastern grass-tubeworm moth, is a moth of the family Acrolophidae. It is found in North America, including Alabama, Arizona, Arkansas, Florida, Georgia, Illinois, Indiana, Iowa, Kansas, Kentucky, Louisiana, Maryland, Mississippi, Missouri, New Jersey, New York, North Carolina, Ohio, Pennsylvania, South Carolina, Tennessee, Texas and Virginia.

The wingspan is about 28 mm. Adults are on wing from April to October.

References

Moths described in 1859
plumifrontella